Mikko Lukka (born 25 May 1974) is a Finnish rally co-driver. He is the co-driver of compatriot Jari Huttunen. They are the champions of the 2020 World Rally Championship-3.

Rally results

WRC results

* Season still in progress.

References

External links
 Mikko Lukka's e-wrc profile

1974 births
Living people
Finnish rally co-drivers
World Rally Championship co-drivers